Tickhill is a civil parish in the metropolitan borough of Doncaster, South Yorkshire, England.  The parish contains 121 listed buildings that are recorded in the National Heritage List for England.  Of these, one is listed at Grade I, the highest of the three grades, four at Grade II*, the middle grade, and the others are at Grade II, the lowest grade.  The parish contains the town of Tickhill and the surrounding countryside.  The parish church, St Mary's Church, is listed at Grade I, and the Grade II* listed buildings are an Augustinian friary converted for domestic use, St Leonard's Hospital, later used as a parish room, a house built in the grounds of Tickhill Castle, and Lindrick House from the early 18th century.  Most of the other listed buildings are houses, cottages, and associated structures, shops and offices, farmhouses and farm buildings.  The rest include the original buttercross and its later replacement, a bridge, a mill, chapels, and a milestone.


Key

Buildings

References

Citations

Sources

 

Lists of listed buildings in South Yorkshire
Buildings and structures in the Metropolitan Borough of Doncaster
Listed